Crystal Palace is a leafy and hilly area in South London, named after the Crystal Palace Exhibition building which stood in the area from 1854, until it was destroyed by fire in 1936.

The area has no defined boundaries and straddles five London boroughs and three postal districts, although there is a Crystal Palace electoral ward and Crystal Palace Park in the London Borough of Bromley. It forms a part of the greater area known as Upper Norwood, and is contiguous with the areas of Anerley, Dulwich Wood, Gipsy Hill, Penge, South Norwood and Sydenham.

Until development began in the 19th century, and before the arrival of the Crystal Palace, the area was known as Sydenham Hill. The Norwood Ridge and an historic oak tree were used to mark parish boundaries. The area is represented by three parliamentary constituencies, four London Assembly constituencies and fourteen local councillors. After the Crystal Palace burned down in 1936, the site of the building and its grounds became Crystal Palace Park, the location of the National Sports Centre which contains an athletics track, stadium and other sports facilities. Crystal Palace Park has also been used as the setting for a number of concerts and films, such as The Italian Job and The Pleasure Garden and contains the Crystal Palace Park Concert Platform, in place since 1997. Two television transmitter masts make the district a landmark location, visible from many parts of Greater London. Local landmarks include the Crystal Palace Triangle, a shopping district made up of three streets forming a triangle; Westow Park, a smaller park that lies off the triangle southwest of Crystal Palace Park; and the Stambourne Woodland Walk.

A pneumatic railway was briefly trialled in the area in 1864. Once the railways arrived, Crystal Palace was eventually served by two railway stations, the high level and low level stations, built to handle the large volume of passengers visiting the exhibition building. After the Palace was destroyed by fire, and with railway travel declining, passenger numbers fell and the high level station was closed in 1954 and demolished seven years later. Rail services gradually declined, and for a period in the 1960s and 1970s, there were plans to construct an urban motorway through the area as part of the London Ringways plan. With rising passenger numbers, additional London Overground services began stopping at the station and a major station redevelopment

Crystal Palace was named in the Sunday Times newspaper's top ten list of "the best places to live in London" of 2016. In April 2022 Crystal Palace was named the best place to live in London by the Sunday Times, and is characterised by a bohemian fusion of urban vibes and village-feel.

History

The ridge and the historic oak tree known as The Vicars Oak (at the crossroads of the A212 Church Road and A214 Westow Hill) were used to mark parish boundaries. This has led to the Crystal Palace area straddling the boundaries of five London Boroughs; Bromley, Croydon, Lambeth, Southwark and Lewisham. The ancient boundary between Surrey and Kent passes through the area, and from 1889 to 1965 the area was on the southeastern boundary of the County of London. It included parts of Kent and Surrey until 1889 and then parts of Kent, London and Surrey between 1889 and 1965.

For centuries the area was covered by the Great North Wood, an extensive area of natural oak forest that formed a wilderness close to the southern edge of the then expanding city of London. The forest was a popular area for Londoners' recreation right up to the 19th century, when it began to be built over. It was also a home of Gypsies, with some local street names and pubs recording the link, and the area still retains vestiges of woodland.

The Crystal Palace

The Crystal Palace, designed by Joseph Paxton, was a remarkable construction of prefabricated parts. It was a cast-iron and glass building originally erected in Hyde Park to house the Great Exhibition of 1851. Following the success of the exhibition, the Palace was moved and reconstructed in 1854 in a modified and enlarged form in the grounds of the Penge Place estate at Sydenham Hill. The buildings housed the  Crystal Palace School of Art, Science, and Literature and Crystal Palace School of Engineering. It attracted visitors for over seven decades.

Sydenham Hill is one of the highest locations in London; 109 metres (357 ft) above sea level (spot height on Ordnance Survey Map); and the size of the Palace and prominence of the site made it easy to identify from much of London. This led to the residential area around the building becoming known as Crystal Palace instead of Sydenham Hill. The Palace was destroyed by fire on 30 November 1936 and the site of the building and its grounds is now known as Crystal Palace Park.

Landmarks

Crystal Palace Triangle

The area is formed by Westow Street, Westow Hill and Church Road, and has a number of restaurants and several independent shops, as well as an indoor secondhand market and a farmer's market on Haynes Lane. The triangle also contains a range of vintage furniture and clothing stores, as well as galleries, arts and crafts shops and other businesses. There is an ongoing campaign to turn a building recently converted into a church at 25 Church Road back into a cinema, after the former bingo hall was purchased by the Kingsway International Christian Centre.

Crystal Palace still retains much of its Victorian architecture, although housing styles are mixed, including Victorian terraces, mid-war terraces and blocks of modern flats. Crystal Palace Park is surrounded by grand Victorian villas, many of which have been converted into flats and apartments.

Transmitters
The towers may appear similar in height and design, but the Crystal Palace mast, constructed in 1956, is on a slightly higher elevation. The current Croydon tower was built in 1962.

Crystal Palace Park

Crystal Palace Park is a large Victorian pleasure ground occupying much of the land within Crystal Palace and is one of the major London public parks. The park was maintained by the LCC and later the GLC, but with the abolition of the GLC in 1986, control of the entire park was given to the London Borough of Bromley. Crystal Palace railway station is located by the park, as is the National Sports Centre. The park was formerly used for sports such as cricket, football and motor racing, and has been a venue for concerts often performed at the site of the Crystal Palace Park Concert Platform. In recent years the park has played host to organised music events such as Wireless Festival and South Facing Festival.

The park is situated halfway along Norwood Ridge at one of its highest points. This ridge offers views northwards to central London, east to the Queen Elizabeth II Bridge and Greenwich, and southward to Croydon and the North Downs. It is also one of the starting points for the Green Chain Walk, linking to places such as Chislehurst, Erith, the Thames Barrier and Thamesmead. Section 3 of the Capital Ring walk round London goes through the park.

Westow Park
A smaller park occupying  is to the southwest of the triangle on Church Road. Westow Park hosts the annual Crystal Palace Overground festival, a free community festival held over four days in the summer.

Stambourne Woods
To the south of the triangle is a small area of woodland occupying , containing the Stambourne Woodland Walk. It was opened in 1984 and covers an area between developments on Stambourne Way and Fox Hill. The land originally formed the gardens of Victorian villas built on the hill overlooking Croydon, but fell into disrepair. In 1962, the Croydon Council approved terms for buying the land from the Church Commissioners and other local freeholders, allowing the construction of a link. Paths and benches were installed but much of the vegetation was left undisturbed, creating a woodland pathway.

Saint Constantine and Helen Greek Orthodox Church
On the Church Road/Westow Street corner is an ornate Greek Orthodox Church which serves the Greek Cypriot and Orthodox community in the surrounding area. Formerly an Anglican church, the walls are now dressed in ornate Byzantine-style art.

Geography

The soil in the area has been classified as typically "Slowly permeable, seasonally wet, slightly acid but base-rich loamy and clayey soils", with impeded drainage, moderate fertility and a loamy profile. The nearest Met Office climate station is based in Greenwich Park.

Local government
Crystal Palace is on the boundary of four London boroughs – Bromley, Croydon, Lambeth and Southwark. A fifth borough – Lewisham – is nearby. As a result, the area is served by a diverse range of local government bodies and Members of Parliament (MPs).

Local authorities

Several local authority councillors in the area were elected on 22 May 2014, at the same time as the European Elections. All seats are now held by Labour party candidates, after 2 Liberal Democrats in Bromley and 1 Conservative in Southwark lost their seats. The elected officials by ward for Crystal Palace local authorities in May 2016 were:

London Assembly
The area is represented by four constituencies in the London Assembly. Their elected assembly members in May 2016 were:

Westminster Parliament
The area is represented by three constituencies in the Westminster Parliament. In May 2015, their elected MPs were:

Media

Films

The Italian Job has a scene filmed at the athletics track in the Crystal Palace sports centre, in which Michael Caine says, "You were only supposed to blow the bloody doors off!" The Pleasure Garden was also filmed in the park and Our Mother's House has a scene featuring Dirk Bogarde with several children on the park's boating lake.

The park features prominently as the setting of an outdoor rave in the music video for The Chemical Brothers' number 1 single "Setting Sun".

Literature
Arthur Conan Doyle was active in the area between 1891 and 1894. Although he lived in nearby South Norwood, he visited the Crystal Palace and Upper Norwood area regularly in connection with the Upper Norwood Literary and Scientific Society. The Foresters Hall on Westow Street was then known as the Welcome Hall (or just Welcome), and it was in that hall in May 1892 that Arthur Conan Doyle was elected President of the society. He was re-elected to the post in 1893 and resigned in 1894. Each occasion was held in the same hall.

The writer Deborah Crombie sets her 2013 mystery, The Sound of Broken Glass, in the Crystal Palace area of London.

Sports

Crystal Palace Football Club

The club were formed in 1905 and initially played their home games at the sports stadium situated inside the grounds of The Crystal Palace. However, in 1915 they were forced to leave due to the First World War and played at nearby Herne Hill Velodrome and the Nest, before moving to their current home at Selhurst Park in 1924.

FA Cup Final
The FA Cup Final was hosted at the Palace sports stadium between 1895 and 1914.

The historical grounds also hosted the first England Rugby Union match against New Zealand in 1905, which New Zealand won by 15–0. The London County Cricket Club also played their matches here, having been formed by The Crystal Palace Company with the help of W. G. Grace.

National Sports Centre

In 1964, a 15,500 seater athletics stadium and sports centre was built on the former site of the football stadium in Crystal Palace Park. The athletics stadium was known as the National Sports Centre and between 1999 and 2012 hosted the London Athletics Grand Prix among other international athletics meetings. The Crystal Palace triathletes club is also based here. Since the London 2012 Olympics, the status of the stadium and aquatics centre as the main facilities for their sports in London has been superseded by the London Aquatics Centre and Olympic Stadium. This led to Crystal Palace F.C. submitting plans to rebuild the stadium as a 40,000 capacity football stadium.

Motor Racing

A motor racing circuit was opened around the Park in 1927 and the remains of the track now make up some of the access roads around the park. Race meetings resumed in 1953, and the circuit hosted a range of international racing events, continuing until the last races in 1974. For three years, from 1997, parts of the circuit were used for a once-a-year sprint time trial similar to a hillclimb before stopping due to development work. The event resumed in 2010 and continued until 2019.

Education

Crystal Palace contains three primary schools, Paxton Primary School, Rockmount Primary School and All Saints C of E Primary School, and one secondary school, Harris City Academy. Crystal Palace Park also contains a branch of Capel Manor College, offering courses in Animal Care, Arboriculture and Countryside, Horticulture and Landscaping and Garden Design along with other short courses.

In 2013, due to a shortage of primary school places in both Crystal Palace and London, proposals to open a new primary school by September 2015 were put forward, with plans submitted to the Department for Education in January 2014. The proposals were approved as part of wave 6 of the Free Schools Programme and the school is scheduled to open in September 2015. As of October 2014, the school is considering three possible building configurations – with the Greater London Authority running a public consultation on each option – all of which would involve demolishing one of the seated stands around the athletics track at the National Sports Centre.

Transport

Roads
The area is served by the A212, A214, A234 and A2199 roads. The roads that make up the triangle (Westow Hill, Westow Street and Church Road) form part of a one-way system and are in a 24-hour controlled parking and loading zone. There is a coach park inside Crystal Palace Park.

The area would have been affected by the cancelled London Ringways motorway plans, as one of the radial routes connecting the South Cross Route to Ringway 2 (the South Cross Route to Parkway D Radial) would have run through a part of Crystal Palace Park, following the railway line.

Cycle routes
London Cycle Network routes 23 and 27 travel through Crystal Palace. Route 27 runs from Anerley Hill through part of Crystal Palace Park towards Bromley and route 23 runs through the Crystal Palace triangle to connect to Borough and Croydon.

Transport for London have proposed to build Quietway route 7 that runs from Crystal Palace to Elephant and Castle. The route was subject to consultation processes in the London Boroughs of Lambeth and Southwark in 2016, with construction to begin in 2017.

Rail

Crystal Palace is accessible by rail from Crystal Palace railway station, where Southern trains run between Victoria on the Crystal Palace Line and London Bridge on the Brighton Main Line, and where London Overground trains run to Highbury & Islington on the East London Line. In addition, Southern services run to Beckenham Junction, Sutton and Epsom Downs. Crystal Palace railway station is one of the few stations to border two zones, Zones 3 and 4. The South Gate of the Park is accessible by rail via Penge West, which is served by Southern trains from London Bridge and London Overground services.

Crystal Palace used to have a second railway station, the Crystal Palace (High Level) railway station. The station was built to serve passengers visiting the Crystal Palace, but after the fire in 1936, traffic on the branch line declined. In World War II, the line serving the station was temporarily closed due to bomb damage. Repairs were made and the line was reopened, but the requirement for reconstruction and the decline in traffic led to a decision to close the station and branch line in 1954, followed by the demolition of the station in 1961. Despite the demolition, a Grade II listed subway remains under Crystal Palace Parade. The Crystal Palace pneumatic railway was also built in Crystal Palace c.1864.

The low level station remain open, although passenger numbers at that station also fell after the fire of 1936 and many services were diverted to serve London–Croydon routes instead of the Victoria–London Bridge route. Rail travel was in decline across the UK in the 1960s and 1970s when the Beeching Axe was imposed. In the 1970s, two outer platforms used by terminating trains were abandoned and the third rail was removed.

More recently rail travel at the station has seen a resurgence and new services have started running. Passenger numbers increased each year between 2004 and 2013. Since May 2010, the station has served the East London Line branch of the London Overground, connecting with the Docklands and Shoreditch. In 2011 services were extended to Highbury and Islington. The station underwent redevelopment in 2012, which brought the original Victorian booking hall back into use, created a new cafe in the station building and provided wheelchair access through the installation of three lifts; this work was completed by the end of March 2013.

Tram
Tram services from Surrey used to operate up Anerley Hill to the Crystal Palace Parade until the 1930s. More recently there have been proposals to connect Tramlink to Crystal Palace, with mayoral candidates citing the desirability of the initiative.

Bus
The area is served by multiple bus routes, many of which terminate at Crystal Palace Bus Station situated on the Parade. These services include routes N2, 3/N3, N63, 122, N137, 157, 202, 227, 249, 322, 358, 363, 410, 417, 432 and 450.

Air
The nearest major international airports are Heathrow and Gatwick. London City Airport and Biggin Hill Airport are also nearby.

Notable people

Marie Stopes, early promoter of sex education and contraception, was raised in a house on Cintra Park shortly after her birth in Edinburgh in 1880.

Joseph Paxton, designer of the Crystal Palace itself and instrumental in having the building reassembled on Sydenham Hill following the success of the Great Exhibition of 1851, lived in a house called "Rockhills" at the top of Westwood Hill.

Benjamin Waterhouse Hawkins, artist and sculptor who created the Crystal Palace Dinosaurs in the park, lived in Belvedere Road between 1856 and 1872.

Jim Bob, Carter USM frontman, currently lives in Crystal Palace.

The African-American Shakespearean actor Ira Aldridge lived in Hamlet Road.

The French novelist Émile Zola lived in what is now the Queen's Hotel on Church Road between October 1898 and June 1899. Zola fled to England after being convicted of criminal libel in France on 23 February 1898, a direct consequence of the publication of his open letter J'Accuse…!.

Francis Pettit Smith, one of the inventors of the screw propeller and a contributor to the construction of the SS Archimedes, lived in the area between 1864 and 1870.

British rapper Speech Debelle was born in Crystal Palace. She left the area because of "traffic and parking problems".

Camille Pissarro, Danish-French Impressionist and Neo-Impressionist painter, stayed in Crystal Palace between 1870 and 1871.

A fuller list of notable people can be found on the same section of the Upper Norwood page.

Nearest places

Anerley
Beckenham
Catford
Dulwich and Dulwich Wood
Elmers End
Forest Hill
Gipsy Hill
Penge
South Norwood
Sydenham
Upper Norwood
West Norwood

See also
The Crystal Palace
Crystal Palace Park
Crystal Palace Dinosaurs
Crystal Palace National Sports Centre
Crystal Palace railway station
Crystal Palace (High Level) railway station
Crystal Palace pneumatic railway
Crystal Palace circuit

References

Citations

Bibliography
Tim Bird, The Great North Wood, Avery Hill Publishing, 2018
Beryl D. Cheeseman, Treetops & Terraces, Theban Publishing, 1991
Beryl D. Cheeseman, Upper Norwood Triangle Memories, Theban Publishing, 2007
John Coulter, Norwood: A Second Selection (Britain in Old Photographs), The History Press, 2012
John Coulter, Norwood Pubs (Images of England), Tempus Publishing, 2006 (reprinted by The History Press)
David R. Johnson, Around Crystal Palace & Penge (Britain in Old Photographs), Sutton Publishing, 2004 (reprinted by The History Press)
Ian Leith, Delamotte's Crystal Palace: A Victorian Pleasure Dome Revealed, English Heritage, 2005 (reprinted by The Crystal Palace Foundation, 2013)
J. R. Piggott, Palace of the People: The Crystal Palace at Sydenham 1854-1936, Hurst & Company, 2004
Nicholas Reed, Crystal Palace and the Norwoods (Images of England), Tempus Publishing, 1995 (reprinted by The History Press)
C. J. Schuler, The Wood that Built London: A Human History of the Great North Wood, Sandstone Press, 2021
Alan R. Warwick, The Phoenix Suburb: A South London Social History, The Blue Boar Press/Norwood Society, 1972 (reprinted 1991 & 2008)

External links 

Crystal Palace Foundation
Crystal Palace Community Association
Upper Norwood Triangle Conservation Plan
Historical images of Crystal Palace
The Transmitter – local magazine
Upper Norwood Library
Virtual Norwood – community web site
The Norwood Society

 
Areas of London
Districts of the London Borough of Bromley
Districts of the London Borough of Croydon
Districts of the London Borough of Lambeth
Districts of the London Borough of Lewisham
Districts of the London Borough of Southwark
Parks and open spaces in the London Borough of Bromley
District centres of London